Symphyotrichum retroflexum (formerly Aster retroflexus) is a species of flowering plant in the family Asteraceae native to the southeastern United States. Its flowers have blue to purple ray florets and cream to pale yellow then pinkish disk florets. , NatureServe classified it as Apparently Secure (G4); it had been reviewed last in 1994 and is marked as "needs review". There is an introduced presence of S. retroflexum in southeast China.

Notes

Citations

References

retroflexum
Flora of the Southeastern United States
Plants described in 1836
Taxa named by John Lindley